The following lists events that happened during 1978 in the Grand Duchy of Luxembourg.

Incumbents

Events

January – March
 1 January – The communes of Asselborn, Boevange, Hachiville, and Oberwampach are merged to form the new commune of Wincrange.

April – June
 12 April – Louis Pilot is appointed the Luxembourg national football team's new coach.
 22 April – Representing Luxembourg, Baccara finishes seventh in the Eurovision Song Contest 1978 with the song Parlez-vous français?.
 11 June – Belgium's Ludo Peeters wins the 1978 Tour de Luxembourg.

July – September

October – December
 1 October – Roger Maul is appointed President of the Council of State to replace Ferdinand Wirtgen.
 15 November – Abortion is legalised.
 5 December – Divorce by determined cause is permitted.
 23 December – Charles Reiffers is appointed to the Council of State.

Unknown
 General Motors shuts down operations at its factory in Bascharage.
 FC Progrès Niedercorn wins the 1977-78 National Division title.

Births
 8 May - Patrick Galbats, photographer
 3 July – Kim Kirchen, cyclist
 9 September – Alvin Jones, basketball player
 29 October – Alwin de Prins, swimmer

Deaths
 12 March – Léon Lommel, clergyman
 15 March – Arthur Useldinger, politician
 29 March – Eugène Schaus, politician
 3 November - Edouard Kutter, photographer

Footnotes

References